Erica Dawson is an American poet and professor. She is the author of three poetry collections.

Biography 
Dawson grew up in Columbia, Maryland. After earning a B.A. degree at Johns Hopkins University and a Master of Fine Arts degree in Poetry at Ohio State University, she earned a Ph.D. at the University of Cincinnati as the Elliston Fellow in Poetry.

Dawson's first poetry collection, Big-Eyed Afraid (Waywiser Press, 2007), was selected for the 2006 Anthony Hecht Poetry Prize by Mary Jo Salter and was named Best Debut of 2007 by the Contemporary Poetry Review. Her second collection, The Small Blades Hurt (Measure Press, 2014), won the 2016 Poets' Prize. A third collection, When Rap Spoke Straight to God, was published by Tin House Books in 2018. Dawson's poems have appeared in many literary journals and anthologies, including Barrow Street, Blackbird, and The Best American Poetry 2008, 2012, and 2015.

Dawson is known for her innovative use of traditional forms. In 2010 she was alleged by A.E. Stallings to have achieved "something like rock star status" among fellow New Formalist poets and poetry fans. She lives in Tampa, Florida, where she directs the University of Tampa's Low-Residency MFA in Creative Writing and serves as poetry editor of the Tampa Review.

References 

1979 births
Poets from Maryland
People from Columbia, Maryland
Writers from Tampa, Florida
Johns Hopkins University alumni
Ohio State University alumni
University of Cincinnati alumni
Living people
American women poets
20th-century American poets
20th-century American women writers
21st-century American poets
21st-century translators
21st-century American women writers
African-American poets
Formalist poets

20th-century African-American women writers
20th-century African-American writers
21st-century African-American women writers
21st-century African-American writers